Aktashite is a rare arsenic sulfosalt mineral with formula Cu6Hg3As4S12. It is a copper mercury-bearing sulfosalt and is the only sulfosalt mineral with essential Cu and Hg yet known.  It is of hydrothermal origin. It was published without approval of the IMA-CNMNC, but recognized as valid species by the IMA-CNMNC Sulfosalts Subcommittee (2008).

References

Arsenic minerals
Mercury minerals
Copper minerals
Sulfosalt minerals
Trigonal minerals
Minerals in space group 146